The 2019 Grand Prix Zagreb Open, was a wrestling event held in Zagreb, Croatia between 9 and 10 February 2019.

 It was held as the second of the ranking series of United World Wrestling.

Medal table

Team ranking

Greco-Roman

Participating nations

152 competitors from 23 nations participated.
 (1)
 (7)
 (2)
 (18)
 (3)
 (3)
 (6)
 (2)
 (15)
 (8)
 (1)
 (6)
 (10)
 (4)
 (8)
 (5)
 (3)
 (1)
 (4)
 (6)
 (16)
 (13)
 (10)

Ranking Series
Ranking Series Calendar 2019:
 1st Ranking Series: 24–28 January, Russia, Krasnoyarsk ⇒ Golden Grand Prix Ivan Yarygin 2019 (FS, WW)
 2nd Ranking Series: 9-10 February, Croatia, Zagreb ⇒ Grand Prix Zagreb Open (GR)
 3rd Ranking Series: 23-24 February, Hungary, Győr ⇒ Hungarian Grand Prix - Polyák Imre Memorial (GR)  
 4th Ranking Series: 28 February-03 March, Bulgaria, Ruse ⇒ 2019 Dan Kolov & Nikola Petrov Tournament (FS, WW, GR) 
 5th Ranking Series: 23-25 May, Italy, Sassari ⇒ Matteo Pellicone Ranking Series 2019 (FS, WW, GR)
 6th Ranking Series: 11–14 July, Turkey, Istanbul ⇒ 2019 Yasar Dogu Tournament (FS, WW)
 7th Ranking Series: 28 February-03 March, Belarus, Minsk ⇒ 2019 Oleg Karavaev Tournament (GR)

References 

Grand Prix Zagreb Open
Grand Prix Zagreb Open
International wrestling competitions hosted by Croatia
Sport in Zagreb
Wrestling in Croatia
Grand Prix Zagreb Open